Yang Fangzhi (born 9 April 1997) is a Chinese footballer who currently plays for Chinese Champions League side Hunan X-ray.

Club career
Yang Fangzhi was loaned to China League One side Dalian Transcendence from Dalian Yifang in June 2017. On 1 July 2017, Yang made his senior debut in a 3–3 home draw against Shenzhen as the benefit of the new rule of the League One that at least one Under-23 player must in the starting and was substituted off in the 6th minute when Dalian was leading 1–0. He played seven league matches in the 2017 season.

Yang was promoted to Dalian Yifang's first team squad in 2018 after the club won promotion to the Chinese Super League. He made his debut on 16 March 2018 in a 3–0 home defeat against Beijing Sinobo Guoan, coming on as a substitute for injury Nicolás Gaitán in the 62nd minute.

In the 2019 season, Yang gained a few chances before July, but was removed from the first team squad after Benítez's arrival.

On 23 July 2020, Yang transferred to Zhejiang Yiteng.

Career statistics
.

References

External links
 

1997 births
Living people
Chinese footballers
Footballers from Wuhan
Dalian Transcendence F.C. players
Dalian Professional F.C. players
Chinese Super League players
China League One players
Association football midfielders
21st-century Chinese people